Phoolko Aankhama is an autobiography by singer and writer Ani Choying Dolma. It was published on April 21, 2008. Ani Choying Dolma is a Nepalese Buddhist nun of Tibetan origin. The book has been translated into 14 languages.

The title of the book is a reference to a popular Nepali song sung by the author.

Translations 

  (2008) by A. Prado
 English: Singing for Freedom (2009)
  (June 2009) by Ana Syder Fontinha
 German : Ich singe für die Freiheit: Die Lebensreise einer buddhistischen Nonne (2009) by Eliane Hagedorn and Bettina Runge 
  (2017) by Dana Soloveanu 
  by Andrzej Sobol-Jurczykowski

See also 

 Singha Durbarko Ghumne Mech
 Antarmanko Yatra
 Jiwan Kada Ki Phool

References

Music autobiographies
Nepalese memoirs
Nepalese autobiographies
Nepalese books
21st-century Nepalese books
Nepali-language books